Mick Bardsley (19 January 1894 – 25 June 1983) was an Australian cricketer. He played eleven first-class matches for New South Wales between 1920/21 and 1925/26.

See also
 List of New South Wales representative cricketers

References

External links
 

1894 births
1983 deaths
Australian cricketers
New South Wales cricketers
Cricketers from Sydney